David Michael Manson (born January 27, 1967) is a Canadian former professional ice hockey defenceman who played in the National Hockey League (NHL) with several teams. He is an assistant coach with the Edmonton Oilers of the National Hockey League (NHL).

Playing career
Manson played junior hockey with his hometown Prince Albert Raiders in the Western Hockey League. He was drafted 11th overall by the Chicago Blackhawks in the 1985 NHL Entry Draft and joined the team a year later. He also played for the Edmonton Oilers, Winnipeg Jets/Phoenix Coyotes, Montreal Canadiens, Dallas Stars and Toronto Maple Leafs. He retired in 2002 with 390 points and 2792 penalty minutes in 1103 career NHL games.

Coaching career
Manson worked as an assistant coach with the Prince Albert Raiders from 2002 to 2009, leaving briefly to take a coaching job with the Prince Albert Mintos. He returned to his post prior to the start of the 2011-12 WHL season, remaining there until 2018.

Manson was hired as an assistant coach for the Bakersfield Condors of the American Hockey League on June 4, 2018.

Manson was hired as an assistant coach for the Edmonton Oilers of the National Hockey League on February 10, 2022.

Transactions
October 2, 1991 – Traded from Chicago Blackhawks with future considerations to Edmonton Oilers for Steve Smith.
March 15, 1994 – Traded from Edmonton Oilers with 6th round pick (Chris Kibermanis) to Winnipeg Jets for Mats Lindgren, Boris Mironov, 1st round pick (Jason Bonsignore) and 4th round pick (Adam Copeland).
March 18, 1997 – Traded from Phoenix Coyotes to Montreal Canadiens for Murray Baron and Chris Murray.
November 16, 1998 – Traded from Montreal Canadiens with Jocelyn Thibault and Brad Brown to Chicago Blackhawks for Jeff Hackett, Eric Weinrich, Alain Nasreddine and conditional draft pick.
February 8, 2000 – Traded from Chicago Blackhawks with Sylvain Côté to Dallas Stars for Kevin Dean, Derek Plante and 2nd round pick in the 2001 draft (Matt Keith).
November 21, 2001 – Traded from Toronto Maple Leafs to Dallas Stars for Jyrki Lumme.

Personal life
Manson and his wife, Lana have four children and reside in Christopher Lake, Saskatchewan.

Their son, Josh is a defenceman for the Colorado Avalanche, while their daughter, Meagan played for the women's soccer team at the University of Saskatchewan. The couple also have twins; a son, Ben, who previously played for the La Ronge Ice Wolves of the Saskatchewan Junior Hockey League from 2017 to 2020 and a daughter, Emma.

Manson is remembered for his low raspy voice, which occurred after taking a hard punch to the throat from Sergio Momesso during a 1991 game. The force of Momesso's punch caused permanent damage to Manson's larynx.

Career statistics

Regular season and playoffs

International

Coaching statistics

Awards
 WHL East Second All-Star Team – 1986

See also
List of NHL players with 1000 games played
List of NHL players with 2000 career penalty minutes

References

External links

1967 births
Living people
Canadian ice hockey defencemen
Chicago Blackhawks draft picks
Chicago Blackhawks players
Dallas Stars players
Edmonton Oilers coaches
Edmonton Oilers players
Ice hockey people from Saskatchewan
Montreal Canadiens players
National Hockey League All-Stars
National Hockey League first-round draft picks
Phoenix Coyotes players
Prince Albert Raiders players
Saginaw Hawks players
Sportspeople from Prince Albert, Saskatchewan
Toronto Maple Leafs players
Utah Grizzlies (AHL) players
Winnipeg Jets (1979–1996) players